The United States Army uses various equipment in the course of their work.

Small arms

Firearms

Explosives

Artillery

Vehicles

MRAP vehicles
The Pentagon bought 25,000 MRAP vehicles since 2007 in 25 variants through rapid acquisition with no long-term plans for the platforms. The Army plans to divest 7,456 vehicles and retain 8,585. Of the total number of vehicles the Army is to keep, 5,036 are to be put in storage, 1,073 used for training and the remainder spread across the active force. The Oshkosh M-ATV will be kept the most at 5,681 vehicles, as it is smaller and lighter than other MRAPs for off-road mobility. The other most retained vehicle will be the Navistar MaxxPro Dash with 2,633 vehicles and 301 Maxxpro ambulances. Other MRAPs such as the Cougar, BAE Caiman, and larger MaxxPros will be disposed.

Vehicle-mounted weapons
 The M240, MK 19, and M2 machine guns can be mounted on vehicles.
 The M134 Minigun, fires 7.62mm ammunition at 3,000 to 4,000 rpm.
 The M3P Machine Gun, an M2 variant with a higher rate of fire mounted on the Avenger Humvee.
 The GAU-19, a rotary gun that fires .50 caliber ammunition. Mounted on Humvees and helicopters.
 The M230 Autocannon fires 30×113mm ammunition at a rate of 625 rounds per minute. It is mounted on the AH-64 Apache and UH-60 Black Hawk Direct Action Penetrator helicopters.
 The M242 Autocannon fires 25×137mm ammunition at a rate of 200 rounds per minute. It is one of the primary armaments of the Bradley Fighting Vehicle, and is one of a variety of anti-air and anti-surface naval armaments.

Aircraft
The U.S. Army operates some fixed-wing aircraft and many helicopters.

Number of aircraft
As of 4 April 2019, the Army has;
193 – fixed-wing/STOL aircraft +
3,372 – rotary-wing/helicopters =
3,565 – total crewed aircraft +
10,441 – UAVs/UCAVs/drones =
14,006 – grand total of aircraft

Vessels
The Army also operates several vessels.

Uniforms

The standard garrison service uniform is known as "Army Greens" or "Class-As". The "Army Blue" uniform, is currently the Army's formal dress uniform, but in 2009 it replaced the Army Green and the Army White uniforms (a uniform similar to the Army Green uniform, but worn in tropical postings) and became the new Army Service Uniform, which functions as both a garrison uniform (when worn with a white shirt and necktie) and a dress uniform (when worn with a white shirt and either a necktie for parades or a bow tie for "after six" or "black tie" events). The Patrol Cap is worn with the ACU for garrison duty; and the beret with the Army Service Uniform for non-ceremonial functions. The Army Blue Service Cap, is allowed for wear by any soldier ranked CPL or above at the discretion of the commander.

Body Armor

Field equipment

Modular sleep system

The Modular Sleep System (MSS) is a sleeping bag kit part of the Extended Cold Weather Clothing System (Gen I to Gen III) used by the United States Army and manufactured by Tennier Industries. It consists of a camouflaged, waterproof, breathable bivy cover, a lightweight patrol sleeping bag, and an intermediate cold-weather sleeping bag (note that the color differs depending on the vintage of the gear). Compression sacks are included to store and carry the system. The MSS is available in a variety of camouflage patterns. The bivy cover can be used with each of three MSS configurations (patrol, intermediate, or combined) to provide environmental protection from wind and water. The sleeping bags are made of ripstop nylon fabrics and continuous-filament polyester insulation; the camouflage bivy cover is made with waterproof, breathable, coated or laminated nylon fabric; the compression sacks are made with water-resistant and durable nylon fabrics.

Army Elements Fleece 
Used by Army aviation crews to adapt to varying mission requirements and environmental conditions.

This section incorporates work from https://peosoldier.army.mil/newpeo/Equipment/Temp.asp?id=CIE_SS, which is in the public domain as it is a work of the United States Military.

3D printing
In November 2012, the U.S. Army developed a tactical 3D printing capability to allow it to rapidly manufacture critical components on the battlefield.
Additive manufacturing is now a capability at Rock Island Arsenal where parts can now be manufactured outside a factory including: 
M1A1 Abrams tank turret
40 mm grenade launcher

Future acquisitions 
The U.S. Army has announced plans to replace numerous weapons in its arsenal, such as the M4 Carbine and M2 Bradley IFV.

See also

Equipment of the United States Armed Forces
Equipment of the United States Air Force
Equipment of the United States Coast Guard
Equipment of the United States Marine Corps
Equipment of the United States Navy
List of equipment of the United States Army during World War II

References

 
United States Army
Equipment